The Adventure of English is a British television series (ITV) on the history of the English language presented by Melvyn Bragg as well as a companion book, written by Bragg. The series ran in November 2003.

The series and the book are cast as an adventure story, or the biography of English as if it were a living being, covering the history of the language from its modest beginnings around 500 AD as a minor Germanic dialect to its rise as a truly established global language.

In the television series, Bragg explains the origins and spelling of many words based on the times in which they were introduced into the growing language that would eventually become modern English.

Episode list

DVD

A two-disc DVD set of the mini-series was released on 2 June 2009 with an overall runtime of 405 minutes.

See also
History of the English language
The Story of English

References

External links
 .
 The Adventure of English at Hodder Headline.
 The Adventure of English at Films Media Group.

2000s British documentary television series
2003 books
2003 British television series debuts
2003 British television series endings
Books by Melvyn Bragg
ITV television dramas
Television series by ITV Studios
London Weekend Television shows